The Nikon F90 (known as the N90 in the United States) is a 35mm SLR camera manufactured between 1992 and 2001 and replaced the earlier Nikon F-801 (N8008 in the U.S.). At the time of its release it was noted for its fast autofocus speed compared to previous Nikon models, which had lagged behind competitor Canon's. It was thus seen by many as a 'stop-gap' measure to prevent the mass migration of many Nikon-using professional photographers to Canon, as Nikon's next fully professional camera, the F5, was some time away from release. The Nikon F4, the professional model available at the time of the F90's release, had very slow autofocus compared to Canon's autofocus SLRs.

The Nikon F90's autofocus system was driven by a small 'peanut' motor in the camera body that drove the lens via a mechanical link, unlike Canon's autofocus system, which used motors built into each lens. It was also the first Nikon SLR to interoperate with the first generation of Nikkor lenses featuring internal focusing motor.

Despite not being intended for the professional market, the Nikon F90 and its upgrade, the F90x, were built to a high standard and were (and are still) used by many professionals.

However, many F90 and F90x bodies had problems with the rubberized back, where the rubberized coating would start peeling or turn into a sticky mess. The rubber around the grip and other parts were not affected. This did not affect the functionality of the back but was a nuisance to users.
The rubberised coating can however be removed (Once the door has been unclipped and safely removed from the camera body) by rubbing gently with a microfibre towel or similar soaked in plenty of Isopropyl Alcohol. This procedure will remove the rubberised top coating without affecting the surface finish of the underlying plastic or the clear film viewing window. The white printed "Vari Program" icons will remain unaffected also. The end result is a hard semi-gloss finish the same as the camera's top plate.

The Nikon F90x (known in the United States as the N90s) was a slightly upgraded version of the F90. Differences included faster and more accurate autofocus and shutter speed adjustments in thirds of a stop versus the full-stop increments of the F90. Frame rate was also increased, along with several other minor upgrades. Weather sealing was also improved. In addition, it eliminated the beeping function of the F90.

Accessories
Nikon N90, F90, N90s and F90x had some accessories that improve the use of this cameras

The optional MB-10 battery grip which takes 4 AA batteries and which fits on to the base of the camera was also introduced. The MB-10 added a vertical-grip shutter release and provides a larger grip area which is especially useful when a large lens is attached to the body. The MB-10 will fully work only on the F90x and N90s models. Plain N90 and F90 models will receive and mount the MB10, but the vertical shutter controls will not work as they lack the necessary internal electrical contacts in the battery chamber.
As the MB-10 operates from exactly the same 4 "AA" cells as the camera body alone, there is no increase in continuous shooting speed or AF speed as in some cameras such as the F4 / F4S. The grip is simply a convenience and handling feature. The operational speed, battery duration and frame rate of the F90X remain identical either with or without the MB-10.

Along with the MF-26 data back, allowing user to change camera's configuration on demand and without using a PC, it creates a powerful set for film photography. The fully programmable MF-26 expands camera's option including multiple exposure, interval & delay mode, very long exposure times (up to 12h), not continuous it can be if you put it on automatic, world time zones, flash exposure bracketing and data imprinting.

The F90 (and subsequent F90x) features a 10-pin remote release socket. The MC-30 is available as a corded remote release and the ML-3 offered as a wireless option. The older MC-20 is also available.

A minor annoyance with the camera is that the cover caps for the remote-control socket and PC Sync sockets are not tethered to the body, and so are very easy to lose or misplace in use. Fortunately, these caps are common to many Nikon models (F100, D2, etc.) and so are readily and cheaply available.

Compatibility
The F90/F90x uses lenses with the Nikon F mount.

The F90 is the first camera to support 3D TTL flash metering with D lenses.

Newer G lenses without aperture rings only fully function under shutter priority and program modes. It does work under manual or aperture priority, however only at the minimum aperture.

Unlike the earlier F-801/F-801s, the F90/F90x supports autofocus with the AF-I/AF-S series lenses with built-in motors.

DX lenses are not recommended as they do not cover the full 35mm frame and will lead to vignetting; however they still will function if use is desired.

Manual focus lenses will work if they are AI or AI converted, albeit with only center weighted and spot metering available. The arrows on the bottom left hand corner of the viewfinder are used to check focus. AI-P lenses, however, will enable matrix metering. non-AI lenses will damage the camera if mounted and the user should not attempt to mount these.

Kodak DCS 400

In collaboration with Nikon, Kodak used F90 and F90s bodies as the basis for the Kodak DCS 400 series of digital SLRs. The DCS 410 and early DCS 420 models used the F90 (badged as N90), and the later DCS 420, DCS 460, and NC2000 used the F90x (badged N90s). The cameras were mounted, with minor modifications, on a Kodak digital back.

The Kodak/Nikon N90S-based digital camera system was purchased by NASA and used on both the Space Shuttle programs and on the International Space Station.

References

External links
 
 Nikon N90s review by Thom Hogan
 Nikon N90S with MB-10 motor drive by luis triguez

F090
F090